Barnstaple Town railway station was an intermediate station on the L&SWR line to Ilfracombe, England.

History

The first station named Barnstaple Town was originally opened as Barnstaple Quay in 1874, and became Barnstaple Town in 1886. It was located in Commercial Road and later formed part of the bus station.  The total cost of rebuilding the station in its later location was about £6,000, of which £2,000 was contributed by the L&B.

Opened on 16 May 1898 to serve as the connection to the Lynton and Barnstaple Railway (L&B), a narrow gauge line that ran through Exmoor from Barnstaple to Lynton and Lynmouth in North Devon, a distance by rail of almost 20 miles. Both lines were controlled by separate signal boxes.

Both lines came under Southern Railway ownership in 1923. The L&B signal box was downgraded to a ground-frame and the LSWR signal box took over control of the narrow gauge line.

The L&B closed in 1935. The main line closed, along with the station, in October 1970.

During the 1980s and early 1990s the old LSWR signal box was operated as a small museum for the L&B and the station building was in use as a restaurant. The signal box is now (2007) empty but the station building is now used as a school.

Combe Rail
In late 2015 a charity named Combe Rail was formed with the intention of establishing a heritage railway on the trackbed of the Ilfracombe-Barnstaple line as well as lobbying for a full reopening in the future.

Gallery

References

External links
Disused Stations site record

Town railway station
Former Lynton and Barnstaple Railway stations
Former London and South Western Railway stations
Railway stations in Great Britain opened in 1898
Railway stations in Great Britain closed in 1970
Disused railway stations in Devon
Beeching closures in England
Grade II listed buildings in Devon